The Libratory is New Zealand's first dedicated steampunk art gallery and was created by Oamaruvian artist Damien McNamara (also known under the pseudonym Damotimus Tipotus). Opened in November 2010, it provides the local steampunk population a gallery in which to display their artwork and sculptures. The venue is located on the first floor of The Woolstore, next to Steampunk HQ, and hosts monthly swap meets where the district's steampunkers exchange ideas, sell goods, and model their fashions. The Libratory changed hands in 2012 and is now branded The Gadgetorium.

References

External links
 Professor Damotimus Tipotus: The Libratory Steampunk Art Gallery

Buildings and structures in Oamaru
Steampunk
Art museums and galleries in New Zealand